Nukleonik was a West German scientific journal covering nuclear physics and nuclear engineering. The journal was established in 1958, shortly after restrictions on nuclear research in West Germany were lifted by the 1955 Paris Agreements.  It was published by Springer Verlag until 1969, as Springer Verlag considered that Zeitschrift für Physik was covering nuclear science sufficiently.

Notable papers 
 (invention of the neutron backscattering spectrometer)

References

Nuclear physics journals
Publications established in 1958
Publications disestablished in 1969
Springer Science+Business Media academic journals
German-language journals